HMS Rushen Castle (K372) was a  of the United Kingdom's Royal Navy. She was named after Castle Rushen in Castletown, Isle of Man.

Built by Swan Hunter & Wigham Richardson Ltd, she was launched on 16 July 1943 and finished on 23 February 1944 - she served as a convoy escort during the Second World War.

She was transferred to the British Air Ministry on 26 September 1960 for use as a weather ship, and was commissioned as Weather Surveyor on 21 December 1961. She was sold on 15 July 1977 and converted to a salvage vessel. She was scrapped at Hendrik-Ido-Ambacht in the Netherlands in 1983.

The wartime commanding officer, R. C. Warwick, RNR, published a book, Really Not Required, detailing his wartime experience on this ship and his previous command, the anti-submarine trawler .

References

Publications
 
 Warwick, Colin, 1997. Really Not Required, Pentland Press,

External links
 Weather Surveyor at www.weatherships.co.uk, including several pictures.

 

Castle-class corvettes
1943 ships
Ships built by Swan Hunter